Hopewell was a small village located south west of St. John's. It had a population of 221 in 1956.

See also
 List of communities in Newfoundland and Labrador

Populated coastal places in Canada
Populated places in Labrador